Metsküla is a village in Alutaguse Parish, Ida-Viru County in northeastern Estonia. As of 2011 Census, there were 13 people living there.

The Selisoo Bog and parts of Muraka and Ratva bogs are located on the territory of Metsküla.

Gallery

References

Villages in Ida-Viru County